The "Hymn to Liberty", or "Hymn to Freedom" (also ), is a poem written by Dionysios Solomos in 1823 that consists of 158 stanzas and is used as the national anthem of Greece and Cyprus. It was set to music by Nikolaos Chalikiopoulos Mantzaros in 1865 and is the longest national anthem in the world by length of text. It officially became the national anthem of Greece in 1865 and Cyprus in 1966.

History 

Dionysios Solomos wrote "Hymn to Liberty" in 1823 in Zakynthos, and one year later it was printed in Messolonghi. It was set to music in 1865 by the Corfiot operatic composer Nikolaos Chalikiopoulos Mantzaros, who composed two choral versions, a long one for the whole poem and a short one for the first two stanzas; the latter is the one adopted as the national anthem of Greece. "Hymn to Liberty" was adopted as the national anthem of Cyprus by order of the Council of Ministers in 1966.

Lyrics 

Inspired by the Greek War of Independence, Solomos wrote the hymn to honour the struggle of Greeks for independence after centuries of Ottoman rule.

"Hymn to Liberty" recounts the misery of the Greeks under the Ottomans and their hope for freedom. He describes different events of the War, such as the execution of Patriarch Gregory V of Constantinople, the reaction of the Great Powers, extensively the Siege of Tripolitsa and the Christian character of the struggle.

Greek original 
The following are the first eight verses of the poem. Only the first two constitute the national anthem of Greece.

Uses 
An adapted version was used during the short-lived Cretan State as the Cretan Anthem. The "Hymn to Liberty" had been the Greek royal anthem after 1864.

"Hymn to Liberty" has been the national anthem of Cyprus since 1966.

"Hymn to Liberty" has been performed at every closing ceremony of the Olympic Games, to pay tribute to Greece as the birthplace of the Olympic Games.

The version commonly played by military bands is an arrangement composed by Lieutenant Colonel Margaritis Kastellis (1907–1979), former director of the Greek Music Corps.

Notes

References

External links 

 
 Short 30 min Version Full version Versions of the Hymn at YouTube
 The Greek Presidency – The website for the Presidency of the Hellenic Republic has a page about the National Anthem, including an instrumental file.
 Michał Bzinkowski, Eleuthería ē Thánatos!: The idea of freedom in modern Greek poetry during the war of independence in 19th century. Dionysios Solomos’ “Hymn to Liberty”
 Neugriechische Volksgesänge, Johann Matthias Firmenich
 The Hymn with all 158 stanzas (in Greek & English)
 From the Official Website of the Greek Presidential Guard
 The Greek national Anthem (in mp3)

Asian anthems
Cypriot music
Greek music
Greek patriotic songs
National symbols of Greece
National symbols of Cyprus
Heptanese School (literature)
European anthems
Works about the Greek War of Independence
National anthems
National anthem compositions in F major
Songs about freedom
Dionysios Solomos
1823 in Greece